Rocking the Cradle: Egypt 1978 is a live album by American rock band the Grateful Dead. It contains two CDs and one DVD and was released in 2008. The album was recorded September 15 & 16, 1978, at the Giza pyramid complex in Giza, Egypt. This was the third continent on which the band performed, having previously performed in Europe. Unlike Dick's Picks, Road Trips, Dave's Picks, and certain other of the band's archival series of live album releases, which are simply two-track stereo recordings made from the soundboard during the concert, the shows on the album were recorded on a 24-track multitrack recorder and were mixed down to stereo just prior to the album's 2008 release.

A bonus disc of additional tracks from the dates was included with early copies of the album. The DVD contains concert footage (all of which is represented either on the two CDs or the bonus disc) from the September 16 performance. It also includes "The Vacation Tapes", a 15-minute feature, from footage originally shot on 8mm silent film, of band members, crew and friends visiting various Egyptian sites.

Concert planning & performance
The idea for the concerts had its origins in an Egyptian vacation taken by band manager Richard Loren. Following some on-the-ground research by Trist's close friend Jonathan Wallace and his meeting with Jehan Sadat, the then-First Lady of Egypt, Loren returned with bassist Phil Lesh and Alan Trist to meet with officials and begin the paperwork and logistics process. Through Wallace's introduction to Joe Malone, a professor at the American University of Beirut who was formerly with the State Department, the trio had made contacts with the Egyptian government. Describing the planning, bassist Phil Lesh said, "It sort of became my project because I was one of the first people in the band who was on the trip of playing at places of power. You know, power that's been preserved from the ancient world. The pyramids are like the obvious number one choice because no matter what anyone thinks they might be, there is definitely some kind of mojo about the pyramids."

Rather than ship all of the required sound reinforcement equipment from the United States, the PA and a 24-track, mobile studio recording truck were borrowed from the Who, in the UK. The Dead crew set up their gear at the open-air theater on the east side of the Great Sphinx, for three nights of concerts. The final two, September 15 & 16, 1978, are excerpted for the album. The band referred to their stage set-up as "The Gizah Sound and Light Theater".

The final night's performance concurred with a total lunar eclipse. Drummer Bill Kreutzmann played with a cast, having broken his wrist while horseback riding. The King's Chamber of the nearby Great Pyramid of Giza was rigged with a speaker and microphone in a failed attempt to live-mix acoustical echo. The guest musician was Hamza El Din, a Nubian oudist whose "Ollin Arageed" appears on the album. He was backed by the students of his Abu Simbel school and accompanied by the Grateful Dead. El Din also appears on the Grateful Dead album Road Trips Volume 1 Number 4.

Lesh recalled that through the shows he observed "an increasing number of shadowy figures gathering just at the edge of the illuminated area surrounding the stage and audiencenot locals, as they all seem to be wearing the same garment, a dark, hooded robe. These, it turns out, are the Bedouin, the nomadic horsemen of the desert: drawn in by the music and lights... each night they have remained to dance and sway rhythmically for the duration of the show." Kreutzmann recalls "Egypt instantly became the biggest, baddest, and most legendary field trip that we took during our entire thirty years as a band... It was priceless and perfect and, at half a million dollars, a bargain in the end. Albeit, a very expensive bargain."

The concerts weren't expected to be profitable (proceeds were donated to the Department of Antiquities and a charity chosen by Jehan Sadat). Costs were to be offset by the production of a triple-live album, however performances did not turn out as proficient as planned, musically, and technical problems plagued the recordings. The results were shelved as the band focused instead on a new studio album, Shakedown Street.

Release
For the 30th anniversary of the event, producer Jeffrey Norman selected usable tracks that featured some of the better performanceschiefly from the final night of the runfor release. A different mix of the tracks "Fire on the Mountain" and "Stagger Lee" had previously appeared on the expanded edition of Shakedown Street. That release also has a different edit of Hamza El Din's performance of "Ollin Arageed". Part of the material on "The Vacation Tapes" DVD previously appeared as a video segment on the music documentary Backstage Pass.

The album title has a double meaning, referring to a rocking cradle and the fact that the Grateful Dead were playing rock music in one of the cradles of civilization. The cover art is by Alton Kelley and further artwork features a pop-up, created by Scott McDougall.

Track listing

Disc one
"Jack Straw" (Robert Hunter, Bob Weir) – 6:44
"Row Jimmy" (Hunter, Jerry Garcia) – 11:46
"New Minglewood Blues" (Noah Lewis) – 6:26
"Candyman" (Hunter, Garcia) – 7:29
"Looks Like Rain" (John Barlow, Weir) – 8:52
"Stagger Lee" (Hunter, Garcia) – 7:30
"I Need a Miracle" > (Barlow, Weir) – 5:45
"It's All Over Now" (Bobby Womack, Shirley Womack) – 7:40
"Deal" (Hunter, Garcia) – 7:04
Notes

Disc two
"Ollin Arageed" > (Hamza El Din) – 6:56
"Fire on the Mountain" > (Hunter, Mickey Hart) – 14:06
"Iko Iko" (James "Sugar Boy" Crawford) – 7:03
"Shakedown Street" > (Hunter, Garcia) – 15:31
"Drums" > (Hart, Bill Kreutzmann) – 3:31
"Space" > (Garcia, Keith Godchaux, Phil Lesh, Weir) – 2:26
"Truckin' " > (Hunter, Garcia, Lesh, Weir) – 10:14
"Stella Blue" > (Hunter, Garcia) – 8:19
"Around and Around" (Chuck Berry) – 8:21
Notes

DVD
"Bertha" > (Hunter, Garcia) – 5:30
"Good Lovin' " (Arthur Resnick, Rudy Clark) – 7:52
"Row Jimmy" (Hunter, Garcia) – 11:20
"New Minglewood Blues" (Lewis) – 6:07
"Candyman" (Hunter, Garcia) – 7:08
"Looks Like Rain" (Barlow, Weir) – 8:33
"Deal" (Hunter, Garcia) – 6:52
"Ollin Arageed" > (El Din) – 7:49
"Fire on the Mountain" > (Hunter, Hart) – 9:12
"Iko Iko" (Crawford) – 6:04
"I Need a Miracle" > (Barlow, Weir) – 5:54
"It's All Over Now" (B. Womack, S. Womack) – 3:30
"Truckin' " (Hunter, Garcia, Lesh, Weir) – 9:23
Notes

Bonus disc
"Bertha" > (Hunter, Garcia) – 7:03
"Good Lovin' " (Resnick, Clark) – 7:55
"El Paso" (Marty Robbins) – 4:58
"Ramble on Rose" (Hunter, Garcia) – 7:51
"Estimated Prophet" > (Barlow, Weir) – 12:00
"Eyes of the World" > (Hunter, Garcia) – 13:26
""Terrapin Station" > (Hunter, Garcia) – 11:35
"Sugar Magnolia" (Hunter, Weir) – 10:42
Note

Recording dates
Disc 1 tracks 1 & 6; Bonus disc tracks 5–8: September 15, 1978
Disc 1 tracks 2–5, 7-9; Disc 2: tracks 1-9; Bonus disc tracks 1–4: September 16, 1978
DVD all tracks: September 16, 1978

Personnel

Grateful Dead

 Jerry Garcia – lead guitar, vocals
 Donna Jean Godchaux – vocals
 Keith Godchaux – keyboards
 Mickey Hart – drums
 Bill Kreutzmann – drums
 Phil Lesh – bass guitar
 Bob Weir – rhythm guitar, vocals

Guest musicians

 Hamza El Din - vocals, oud, tar, hand clapping on "Ollin Arageed"
 The Nubian Youth Choir - vocals, hand clapping, tar on "Ollin Arageed"

Production

Concert executive producer – Richard Loren
Concert sound – Dan Healy
Concert video – Gary Biddle
Sound recording – John Kahn, Betty Cantor-Jackson, Bob Matthews
PA system and recording equipment provided by The Who
Lighting director – Candace Brightman
Video documentary – Richard Loren
Compilation produced by – David Lemieux
Stereo and 5.1 mix – Jeffrey Norman at Garage Audio, Petaluma, CA
Concert video post-production at Video Arts, San Francisco
Concert video mastering  – David Glasser at Airshow Mastering
CD mastering – Jeffrey Norman
Audio restoration – Jamie Howarth / Plangent Processes
Audiovisual research – Mike Johnson
Archival research – Eileen Law / Grateful Dead Archives
Cover art – Kelley
Art direction – Steve Vance, Scott Webber
Package design – Steve Vance
Pop-up art – Scott McDougall
Liner notes essay "A Venue for Recollection" – Alan Trist
Dedicated to the memory of Jerry Garcia, Keith Godchaux, John Kahn, Hamza El Din, Lawrence "Ramrod" Shurtliff, Goldie Rush, Ken Kesey, Alton Kelly, Bill Graham, Anwar Sadat, and Menachem Begin

See also
 Backstage Pass
 Shakedown Street

Charts
Album - Billboard

References

2008 live albums
Grateful Dead live albums
Giza pyramid complex